The chief minister of Gibraltar is the head of His Majesty's Government of Gibraltar who is elected by the Gibraltar Parliament, and formally appointed by the governor of Gibraltar, representative of the British monarch. The incumbent chief minister is Fabian Picardo, since 9 December 2011, leader of the Gibraltar Socialist Labour Party.

List of chief ministers of Gibraltar

See also
 List of current heads of government in the United Kingdom and dependencies
 Governor of Gibraltar

 
Gibraltar-related lists